The Roncal Valley is a valley and mancomunidad in the very east of Navarre, bordering the autonomous community of Aragon to the East and France to the north. It is part of the Merindad of Sangüesa. The Ezka River, a tributary of the Aragón, flows from north to south through the center of the valley.

The Roncalese dialect of Basque was historically spoken within this valley. It shares its name with the town and municipality of Roncal. While the last speakers of the valley's traditional dialect have passed away, the valley is located in Navarre's mixed language zone and does have a number of Basque speakers.

Government 

Tourism 
As a tourist destination, the Roncal Valley is known for hiking trails in the Pyrenees, its villages, the tomb of the tenor Julián Gayarre, and the Larra-Belagua Ski Center.

Cheese 
The Roncal Valley is well known for its local artisan cheese, named Roncal cheese after the valley. Inhabitants of the valley have worked to develop food tourism based on the local cheese. The cheese enjoys Spanish  and EU Protected designation of origin status.

Language 
The Roncal Valley was historically home to the Roncalese dialect of Basque and all of its municipalities are located in Navarre's mixed language zone.
The last native speakers of Roncalese Basque died in the 1970s and 80s, and the Spanish spoken in the area retains some influence from Basque.

Notably, in Spanish, word-final -r corresponds to a single, tapped -r- in related words.
The demonyms used in the Roncal Valley's Spanish are likely the only exceptions to that rule, because of Basque influence.
In Basque, word-final -r typically corresponds to a double, trilled -rr- in related words.
According to José Ignacio Hualde, in the Roncal Valley's Spanish, each town's demonym is formed with the borrowed Basque suffix , whose final -r becomes a trill before the Spanish plural or feminine form. Thus, the masculine single form  'man from Garde' corresponds to the feminine  and the plural .
This is restricted to the Roncal Valley because of a particularity of Roncalese Basque. In other dialects the citation form of nouns has the article  at the end, and nouns and adjectives borrowed into Spanish under that form.

See also 
 Salazar Valley

References

External links 
 Official tourism website

Valleys of Spain
Comarcas of Navarre
Landforms of Navarre